Tom Simpson (born August 12, 1952) is a Canadian retired professional ice hockey player who played 314 games in the World Hockey Association.

Career 
During his career, Simpson played with the Toronto Toros, Birmingham Bulls, and Edmonton Oilers. Since retiring from hockey, Simpson has worked as a health and safety coordinator.

Personal life 
Simpson lives in Peterborough, Ontario, and has three sons.

External links

1952 births
Living people
Birmingham Bulls players
Canadian ice hockey right wingers
Edmonton Oilers (WHA) players
Ice hockey people from Ontario
Ottawa Nationals players
Sportspeople from Clarington
Toronto Toros players
Tucson Rustlers players
St. Louis Blues draft picks
20th-century Canadian people